The Wills Wing Falcon is a family of American high-wing, single-place and two-place hang gliders, designed and produced by Wills Wing of Orange, California. The aircraft is supplied complete and ready-to-fly.

The Falcon series is the best-selling glider that the company has produced and it has remained in continuous production over more than twenty years, in increasingly refined versions.

Design and development
The Falcon was designed as a simple, easy to fly glider for local recreational soaring, as an alternative to high performance, but harder to fly gliders. It is made from aluminum tubing, with the single-surface wing covered in Dacron sailcloth. Its wing is cable braced from a single kingpost.

The aircraft has been developed from the original Falcon model, through the Falcon 2, 3 and 4 versions, each in a variety of sizes, including tandem two place versions for flight training. The models are each named for their wing area in square feet.

All models are HGMA certified.

Variants
Falcon 140
Small-sized model for lighter pilots, introduced in 1995. The glider model is DHV 1 certified.
Falcon 170
Mid-sized model for medium-weight pilots, introduced in 1995. The glider model is DHV 1 certified.
Falcon 195
Large-sized model for heavier pilots, introduced in 1994. The glider model is DHV 1 certified.
Falcon 225
Large-sized model for heavier pilots, introduced in 1995.
Falcon 2 140
Small-sized model for lighter pilots, introduced in 2003.
Falcon 2 170
Mid-sized model for medium-weight pilots, introduced in 2003.
Falcon 2 195
Large-sized model for heavier pilots, introduced in 2003.
Falcon 2 225
Large-sized model for heavier pilots, introduced in 2003.
Falcon Tandem
Tandem model for flight training, introduced in 2003.
Falcon 3 145
Small-sized model for lighter pilots, introduced in 2009.
Falcon 3 170
Mid-sized model for medium-weight pilots, introduced in 2009.
Falcon 3 195
Large-sized model for heavier pilots, introduced in 2009.
Falcon 3 Tandem
Tandem model for flight training, introduced in 2009.
Falcon 4 145
Small-sized model for lighter pilots, introduced in 2015. Improvements over the Falcon 3 include a new sail cut and layout, improved lateral stability at higher speeds and under aero towing and an optional Litestream control bar.
Falcon 4 170
Mid-sized model for medium-weight pilots, introduced in 2015. Improvements over the Falcon 3 include a new sail cut and layout, improved lateral stability at higher speeds and under aero towing and an optional Litestream control bar.
Falcon 4 195
Large-sized model for heavier pilots, introduced in 2015. Improvements over the Falcon 3 include a new sail cut and layout, improved lateral stability at higher speeds and under aero towing and an optional Litestream control bar.
Falcon 4 Tandem
Tandem model for flight training, introduced in 2015. This is a development of the Falcon 3 Tandem that incorporates stiffer and lighter 7075-T6 aluminum leading edge spars, a higher batten density sail with speed battens, an improved sail cut with new colors and an all-laminate sail as an option.

Specifications (Falcon 4 145)

References

External links

Falcon
Hang gliders